Gates of Heaven is an album by Do As Infinity. It was released in 2003. "Azayaka na Hana" is one of the first songs Ryo Owatari wrote before auditioning for Do as Infinity, it was written for his former band, Peek-A-Boo! He also recorded a new version of the song with his new band Missile Innovation in their self-titled mini-album. The Asia version of the album included a Mandarin version of Shinjitsu no Uta as a bonus track.

Track listing

Chart positions

External links
 Gates of Heaven at Avex Network
 Gates of Heaven at Oricon

2003 albums
Do As Infinity albums
Avex Group albums
Albums produced by Seiji Kameda